PSG Institute of Medical Sciences and Research is a teaching hospital and research institute located in Peelamedu, Coimbatore. It was established in 1985 as a part of PSG Group. It has NABH accreditation. PSG Hospitals, a 1400-bed, tertiary care hospital was recently awarded with JCI prime certification  and has become the first hospital in TamilNadu to receive the accreditation. The hospital is affiliated to the PSG Institute of Medical Sciences and Research and has been recognized as an institution that offers students with multiple facilities at the undergraduate and postgraduate level. PSG Institute of Paramedical Sciences and Nursing are associated with the institute.

Teaching 

PSG Institute of Medical Sciences and Research offers teaching from undergraduate to postgraduate levels.

Rankings

The PSG College of Pharmacy was ranked 51 by the National Institutional Ranking Framework pharmacy ranking of 2020. and 27 among medical colleges. and ranked 4th in the National Level in the recently released Outlook Rankings

PSG received it's JCI-PRIME certification on August 24, 2021.

References

Universities and colleges in Coimbatore
Teaching hospitals in India
Hospitals in Tamil Nadu
1985 establishments in Tamil Nadu
Hospitals established in 1985